On 6 January 2022, a traffic collision between a truck and minibus killed eight people and injured two others in the West Bank. The crash occurred at Petzal Junction on Highway 90, which is considered one of Israel's most dangerous highways.

Events 
The crash occurred on Highway 90 in the West Bank. The stretch where the crash occurred was a winding section near the Israeli settlement of Petza'el. Dashcam footage showed a truck crashing into the minibus head-on as the van made a left turn off the highway. Both vehicles were Palestinian registered. Police said the victims were teenage labourers from the town of Aqraba.

Response 
President of Palestine Mahmoud Abbas declared a day of mourning. Defence Minister of Israel Benny Gantz tweeted his condolences to the victims.

On 7 January, the day after the accident, many Palestinians gathered in Aqraba, a Palestinian town in Samaria, for the joint funeral.

References 

History of the West Bank
West Bank bus crash
West Bank bus crash
History of Palestine (region)
Road incidents in Asia